Arfa Software Technology Park (previously known as Software Technology Park) is a skyscraper building and information technology park in Lahore, Punjab, Pakistan, built in 2009. It is home to the Information Technology University and PITB. The main building consists of 17 floors and is 106 meters tall. It is currently the tallest building in Lahore.

On 15 January 2012, Chief Minister of Punjab Mian Shahbaz Sharif announced a name change of Software Technology Park to Arfa Software Technology Park after the youngest Microsoft Certified Professional Arfa Karim, who died at the age of 16.

See also
 List of tallest buildings in Pakistan
 List of parks and gardens in Lahore
 List of parks and gardens in Pakistan

References

Science and technology in Punjab, Pakistan
2009 establishments in Pakistan
Buildings and structures in Lahore
Economy of Lahore
Science parks in Pakistan
Information technology in Pakistan
Skyscrapers in Lahore
Office buildings in Lahore